Harlem River Blues is Justin Townes Earle's third studio album, released on January 1, 2010, on Bloodshot Records.

Track listing

Personnel 
Justin Townes Earle – vocals, acoustic guitar, claps and choir vocals
Skylar Wilson – organ, electric piano, vibes, percussion, synth and claps
Bryn Davies – upright bass, cello, bowed bass, harmony and choir vocals
Jason Isbell – electric guitar and choir vocals
Brian Owings – drums and percussion
Josh Hedley – violins, fiddles, claps, harmony and choir vocals
Paul Niehaus – steel guitar
Ketch Secor – harmonica
Phil Lassiter – trumpet
Jeff Coffin – saxophone
Caitlin Rose – choir vocals
Jordan Caress – choir vocals
Alex Caress – choir vocals
Rayland Baxter – choir vocals
Black Wilkins – claps

References 

2010 albums
Bloodshot Records albums
Justin Townes Earle albums